The Challenger is a 2015 American sports drama film written and directed by Kent Moran and executive produced by Michael Clarke Duncan, who also co-stars in his last feature film released after his death. Additionally, The Challenger features Kent Moran, S. Epatha Merkerson and Justin Hartley.

Filming began in January 2012 in The Bronx, New York, and the film was released domestically on September 11, 2015.

Plot 

With the help of legendary boxing trainer Duane Taylor (Duncan), struggling Bronx auto mechanic Jaden Miller (Moran) turns to boxing to save him and his mother (Merkerson) from living on the streets.

Cast

Production 
The film was Kent Moran's directorial debut. He had previously starred in and produced Listen to Your Heart.

Filming began on January 17, 2012, in The Bronx, where the film takes place and wrapped on July 10, 2012.

Release 
The film was released domestically on September 11, 2015.

Festival circuit 
Awards
Gasparilla International Film Festival Audience Award Winner 2015
Nashville Film Festival Audience Award Winner, 2nd Place 2015
Nashville Film Festival Audience Award Winder, New Directors Competition 2015
Palm Beach International Film Festival, Audience Award 2015

Placement
Portland Film Festival, Offshoot Film Festival, Great Cleveland Urban Film Festival, Montreal World Film Festival, Beverly Hills Film Festival, Nashville Film Festival, Gasparilla Film Festival, Rhode Island International Film Festival, Palm Beach International Film Festival, Julien Dubuque International Film Festival, Arizona International Film Festival, Dances with Films, Boston International Film Festival, Stony Brook Film Festival (Long Island)

References

External links 
 
 

2010s sports drama films
American sports drama films
2015 films
American boxing films
Films scored by Pinar Toprak
Films set in the Bronx
Films set in the 2010s
2015 drama films
2010s English-language films
2010s American films